Josif Budo (7 January 1968 - 10 July 1990) was a young Albanian activist who became the first martyr of the anti-communist uprising in Albania. A street in his hometown Kavajë is named in his honor.

References

1968 births
1990 deaths
Martyrs from Kavajë